Megachile harrarensis is a species of bee in the family Megachilidae. It was described by Friese in 1915.

References

Harrarensis
Insects described in 1915